Stephen Paget (17 July 1855 – 8 May 1926) was an English surgeon and pro-vivisection campaigner. He proposed the "seed and soil" theory of metastasis, which claims the distribution of cancers are not coincidental. He was the son of the distinguished surgeon and pathologist Sir James Paget.

Biography

Paget was born on 17 July 1855 at Cavendish Square, London. He was the fifth child and fourth son of Sir James Paget (1814–1899).

Paget was educated at Shrewsbury School. He matriculated at Christ Church, Oxford in 1874, graduating B.A. in 1878 (M.A. 1886). He was a student at St Bartholomew's Hospital and obtained the F.R.C.S. in 1885. He was elected assistant surgeon to the Metropolitan Hospital and was surgeon at West London Hospital. He was surgeon to the Throat and Ear Department at Middlesex Hospital. 

Paget died in Limpsfield on 8 May 1926.

Proposed theory 
Paget has long been credited with proposing the "seed and soil" theory of metastasis, even though in his paper "The Distribution Of Secondary Growths In Cancer Of The Breast"  he clearly states "…the chief advocate of this theory of the relation between the embolus and the tissues which receive it is Fuchs…". Ernst Fuchs (1851-1930) an Austrian ophthalmologist, physician and researcher however, doesn't refer to the phenomenon as "seed and soil", but defines it as a "predisposition" of an organ to be the recipient of specific growths. In his paper, Paget presents and analyzes 735 fatal cases of breast cancer, complete with autopsy, as well as many other cancer cases from the literature and argues that the distribution of metastases cannot be due to chance, concluding that although "the best work in pathology of cancer is done by those who… are studying the nature of the seed…" [the cancer cell], the "observations of the properties of the soil" [the secondary organ] "may also be useful..."

Approbation of Louis Pasteur 
In addition to other publications, he also wrote a book about Louis Pasteur titled Pasteur and After Pasteur. Pasteur's life is discussed from his early life through his accomplishments. Paget wrote this book in memoriam of Pasteur's life, and in the preface he states, "It has been arranged to publish this manual on September 28th, the day of Pasteur's death. That is a day which all physicians and surgeons -- and not they alone -- ought to mark on their calendars; and it falls this year with special significance to us, now that his country and ours are fighting side by side to bring back the world's peace."

Vivisection

After his retirement from medical practice in 1910, Paget devoted much time to justifying vivisection.  He was secretary of the Research Defence Society. He authored The Case Against Anti-Vivisection in 1904 and was the editor of For and Against Experiments on Animals, 1912. Paget was heavily criticized by anti-vivisectionists. In 1962, Archibald Hill noted that "Stephen Paget's death indeed was claimed by anti-vivisectionists as a direct consequence of their prayers."

Criticism of Christian Science

In 1909, Paget authored a book, The Faith and Works of Christian Science which exposed the fallacies, inconsistencies, and dangers of Christian Science.

Selected publications

The Case Against Anti-Vivisection. 1904.
 

Ambroise Paré and His Times, 1510-1590 (1897)
Confessio Medici. 1908.
The Faith and Works of Christian Science. 1909.

For and Against Experiments on Animals. 1912.

References

External links
 
 
 

1855 births
1926 deaths
Alumni of Christ Church, Oxford
Critics of Christian Science
English surgeons
People educated at Shrewsbury School
Vivisection activists
Younger sons of baronets